, is a Japanese teacher, model and beauty pageant titleholder who was crowned Miss Universe Japan 2014 and represented Japan in Miss Universe 2014.

Early life
Tsuji is a student of Japanese literature at a Japanese college, an artist in Nagasaki and a teacher of art origami in Japan.

Pageantry

Miss Nagasaki 2014
Tsuji was crowned Miss Nagasaki 2014 and became eligible to compete at the Miss Universe Japan pageant in 2014.

Miss Universe Japan 2014
Tsuji was crowned Miss Universe Japan represented Nagasaki together with Toru Higa who was crowned as Mister Japan 2014 from Okinawa. The event
was held at the Chinzanso Hotel, Tokyo, on March 18, 2014.

Miss Universe 2014
Tsuji competed at Miss Universe 2014 in Miami, Florida, United States. She was unplaced on the final night.

References

External links 

Miss Universe Japan

1993 births
Living people
Japanese beauty pageant winners
Japanese female models
Miss Universe 2014 contestants
People from Nagasaki